The Philippine Rural Reconstruction Movement, abbreviated as PRRM, is a non-governmental organization and institution formed in 1952 to assist peasants in the Philippines. As a movement, it was initiated by upper and middle class group of individuals based on the experiences gained from the rural reconstruction and development done in China during the beginning of the 1900s. After World War II, among its tasks had been the establishment of cooperatives in rural communities. It was the inspiration for the founding of the Federation of Free Farmers in 1953, as well as the birthing of organizations similar to PRRM in other countries such as Thailand, Colombia, India, and Guatemala. Its main office is in Quezon City, which became possible through Dr. Yen's establishment of another related organization during the 1960s, namely the International Institute of Rural Reconstruction (IIRR).

Historical background 
In the 1900s, the Philippine Rural Reconstruction Movement was founded and inspired by its then leader Dr. Y.C. James "Jimmy" Yen (also known as Yan Yangchu), a national of China. It was brought the Philippines, specifically in Nueva Ecija and then also in Rizal province, by Filipinos such as Conrado Benitez, a person connected to the University of the Philippines, with the vision to empowering and developing rural communities and the aim of providing training on self-government and on how such communities can sustain itself globally, nationally, and locally.

Apart from Conrado Benitez, original members of PRRM's Board of Trustees also included Salvador Araneta, Cornelio Balmaceda, Cecilio Putong, Juan Salcedo, Jr., Asuncion A. Perez, Gil Puyat, Paul R. Parrette, Manuel P. Manahan, and Albino Z. Sycip. Apart from Benitez, Sycip, Putong and Salcedo, Jr., PRRM's original incorporators also included Esteban E. Abada, Eulogio Rodriguez, Jr., Roland Renne, Juan Cojuangco, Oscar B. Arellano, and Jose S. Camus.

In 1970, former Philippine Secretary of Health and Senator Dr. Juan Flavier, conveyed his experiences working with and for PRRM in his book Doctor to the Barrios.

In 2009, PRRM became a partner of the Ayala Foundation USA, with the task of building potable water facilities within chosen Philippine barangays.

Goals 
Among its present-day roles is the promotion of sustainable agriculture, technologies in the fishing business and farming, agroforestry, planning and implementation of managing resources in communities, the fight against ignorance through education, the fight against poverty through livelihood training, the fight against diseases through health education, improvement in access to justice, restoration of cohesion and connection among and between communities, creation of livelihood, environmental stewardship, awareness of public policies, and the dissemination of information to other Philippine and Asian non-governmental organizations.

Future Goals 
A core objective of the Philippine Rural Reconstruction Movement is to build up the Conrado Benitez Institute for Sustainability (CBIS), which functions as the educational, research and technical troubleshooting wing of the PRRM.   By focusing on education for sustainability through providing educational courses which cover topics such as sustainable local economy, agriculture, coastal resource management, new and renewable energy, and gender issues, CBIS aims to inculcate sustainability into the future generation.

In addition, the PRRM intends to advocate issues related to environment and sustainable development, economic development, social development and the rights of women, children and youth, and governance and citizen’s participation.

Other long-term goals also include: the creation of an organization information database and the implementation of a “report card” system. The former acts as the basis for monitoring the ongoing projects and operations and the aim is to boost the efficiency of the different operations by at least 25%. While for the latter allows progress and accomplishments of ongoing projects to be recorded and reported. The PRRM aims to achieve workflow streamlining, publication exposure and quality, improved staff training and management accountability.

References

External links 
 PRRM official website

Non-profit organizations based in the Philippines
Rural community development
Sustainability organizations